Double exposure is a photographic technique in which two images are captured and combined into a single image.

Double exposure may also refer to:

Film
 Double Exposures (1937 film), directed by John Paddy Carstairs
 Double Exposure (1944 film), directed by William Berke
 Double Exposure (1954 film), directed by John Gilling
 Double Exposure (1976 film), starring Anouska Hempel
 Double Exposure (1982 film), directed by William Byron Hillman
 Double Exposure (1994 film), starring Ron Perlman
 Double Exposure (2014 film), directed by Li Jinhang

Television and radio
 Double Exposure (comedy series), a Canadian radio and TV show
 Double Exposure (U.S. TV series), a reality television series aired on Bravo
 Double Exposure (game show), a Heatter-Quigley Productions game show which aired in 1961
 "Double Exposure", an episode from the third season of Columbo

Music
 Double Exposure (Nat Adderley album)
 Double Exposure (Joe Chambers album)
Double Exposure (Chris Connor and Maynard Ferguson album)
 Double Exposure (band), an American band from the disco era
 Double Exposure (John Pizzarelli album)

Other
 Double exposure patterning, a technique for improving the resolution of patterning semiconductors
 Double Exposure Blackjack, a variety of blackjack
 Double Exposure (novel), by Australian author Brian Caswell
 Double exposure (poetic form) invented by Greg Williamson

See also
 Exposure (disambiguation)
 Double Xposure, a 2012 Chinese film